Whicker's World was a British television documentary series that ran from 1958 to 1994, presented by journalist and broadcaster Alan Whicker.

Originally a segment on the BBC's Tonight programme in 1958, Whicker's World became a fully-fledged television series in its own right in the 1960s. The series was first shown by the BBC until 1968, and then by ITV from 1968 to 1983, when it was produced by Yorkshire Television, in which Whicker himself was a shareholder. The series returned to the BBC in 1984, and to ITV again in 1992.

Series history
Whicker reported stories of social interest from around the world. His interviewees included locals, politicians, celebrities, and even convicted criminals as he reported on stories as far ranging as military dictatorships, British expatriates, the feminist movement of the 1970s, the Tanka people of Hong Kong, the American Gay Rights movement, the building of Disneyworld in Florida, and the plastic surgery industry. Among his interviewees were actors Peter Sellers, Joan Collins, Britt Ekland, Liza Minnelli, and Christopher Lee, Haitian dictator François "Papa Doc" Duvalier, Paraguayan dictator Alfredo Stroessner, novelist Harold Robbins, Lula Parker Betenson (the 94-year-old sister of the outlaw Butch Cassidy), the Sultan of Brunei Hassanal Bolkiah (reputedly the richest man in the world at the time of filming), opera singer Luciano Pavarotti, several former Maharajas of India, and various members of the British aristocracy.

Although episodes were self-contained, Whicker would often film a series of episodes devoted to one particular location or subject, including five whole series devoted to the United States and three about Australia. Multi-episode series dedicated to the South Pacific, Europe, India, Hong Kong, Spain, and a voyage on the QE2 were also made. These were usually given series titles such as Whicker's New World (1969), Whicker In Europe (1970), Whicker's Walkabout: Seven Scenes Down Under (1970), Whicker Within A Woman's World (1972), Whicker Way Out West (1973), Whicker's South Seas (1973), Whicker's World Down Under (1976), Whicker's World: A Fast Boat to China (1984), Whicker's World: Living With Uncle Sam (1985), Whicker's World: Living with Waltzing Maltilda (1988), and Whicker's World: A Taste of Spain (1992). Two episodes were filmed on the Orient Express, the first on the Venice-Simplon Orient Express in 1982 and the second on the Eastern and Oriental Express in 1993.

In 1998, Whicker made a six-part radio series, Around Whicker's World, for BBC Radio 2. In 2009, he returned to television with Alan Whicker's Journey Of A Lifetime, a four-part series for the BBC in which he revisited some of the locations and people shown in Whicker's World decades earlier to see how their lives had progressed since his original interviews with them. Included in this was a third visit to American plastic surgeon Dr. Kurt Wagner and his wife Kathy, whom Whicker had already made two programmes about in 1973 and 1980 and had considered them among his favourite interviewees.

The series had several theme tunes over the course of its run. The original theme music for the programme was "West End" composed by Laurie Johnson. When the series moved over to ITV in the late 1960s, a new theme was incorporated entitled "Horizons" by Frank Talley and The New Concert Orchestra which was used until 1977. In 1978 Andrew Lloyd Webber composed a new theme for the series that was used until the early 1980s. When the series returned to the BBC in 1984, "Newsweek", a piece composed by Graham de Wilde for KPM Musichouse, was used as the theme.

Awards
Whicker's World was a huge ratings success in the UK, and one of the longest running series in the history of British television. The series was nominated for a variety of awards throughout its run including several BAFTA Awards. The 1977 episode "Palm Beach" garnered three BAFTA nominations for Best Documentary, Best Sound, and Best Editing, and Whicker himself won the Richard Dimbleby Award at the 1977 BAFTA ceremony, and had also won a BAFTA in 1964 for his presentation in the Factual category.

In 1971, the series won the Dumont International Journalism Award at the University of California for the 1969 episode "Papa Doc - The Black Sheep" (in which Whicker interviewed Haitian dictator François "Papa Doc" Duvalier). The episode "Harold Robbins - I'm The World's Best Writer" won the Best Interview Programme Award at the Hollywood Festival of World Television in 1972.

DVD release
Network have released three volumes of the series on DVD, compiling some of the more prominent ITV episodes from the 1960s, '70s, and '80s. The first and second volumes were released as two-disc sets containing eight and ten episodes respectively. The third volume contains thirteen episodes over three discs, though a second version was also released containing only ten episodes over two discs. A seven-disc set containing all three volumes, The Best of Whicker, is set for release on 16 October 2017. To date, of all the BBC episodes, only the  2009 Journey Of A Lifetime series has been released, along with a 1968 episode on the 2020 Blu-ray release of The Power of the Daleks.

In May 2016, Network also began releasing each full ITV series of Whicker's World in chronological order, beginning with the 1968 series, followed by Whicker's New World from 1969. This was followed in July 2017 by two more DVD sets, Whicker In Europe (1970) and Whicker's Walkabout: Seven Scenes Down Under (1970). Two further sets, comprising the 1971 series and 1972's Whicker's Orient, were released in November 2017.

Merchandising
Several books, written by Whicker, were published as tie-ins to the series, including Whicker's New World (1985) and Whicker's World Down Under (1988). Whicker's autobiography, Within Whicker's World, was published in 1982, which chronicled many of the journeys he had made in the series. A second volume, Whicker's World - Take 2, was published in 2002, and a third volume, Journey of a Lifetime, was published in 2009.

The Whicker's World brand also spread into other merchandise tie-ins. In the 1970s, Whitman Publishing released Whicker's World jigsaw puzzles featuring stills from Whicker's travels. A board game based on Whicker's World was released in 1989 by Paul Lamond Games.

Cultural impact
In the late-1960s, the series was spoofed by the British comedian Benny Hill who did a sketch on his show called "Knickers World". It was parodied again in 1972 by Monty Python's Flying Circus, who did a sketch set on a tropical island called "Whicker Island" where all of the inhabitants were Alan Whicker clones.

In the 1980s, Whicker appeared in several television commercials for Barclaycard that were based on Whicker's World and featured Whicker in various foreign locations.

In 1981, Whicker's World was spoofed by The Evasions, a British funk group whose novelty song "Wikka Wrap" featured songwriter Graham de Wilde impersonating Whicker. The single reached the UK Top 20 in June 1981; the song was later sampled in American rapper Coolio's 1996 song "1, 2, 3, 4 (Sumpin' New)".  Graham de Wilde also composed the theme tune for the 1980s BBC episodes of Whicker's World.

Legacy
The Whicker's World Foundation is an organisation that was created by Alan Whicker to encourage the making of quality documentary programmes. Overseen by Whicker's partner Valerie Kleeman and run by documentary maker Jane Ray, each year the foundation awards £100,000 to a new director with the most promising pitch for an authored film or television documentary. There are also separate funding and recognition awards for audio documentaries.

See also
 Around Whicker's World

References

External links
 

1958 British television series debuts
1994 British television series endings
1950s British documentary television series
1960s British documentary television series
1970s British documentary television series
1980s British documentary television series
1990s British documentary television series
British television documentaries
BBC television documentaries
ITV documentaries
Television series by Yorkshire Television